Gary West (8 June 1960 – 20 August 2017) was an Australian Olympic cyclist and track cycling coach.

He competed in the points race event at the 1984 Summer Olympics. He was also an alternate on the gold medal-winning team pursuit squad  at the 1984 Games. At the 1982 Commonwealth Games in Brisbane, West won a gold medal as a member of the men's team pursuit.

West had an extensive  track cycling coaching career. He worked for the Japan Cycling Federation and the United States Cycling Federation. In 2006, West was appointed Head Cycling Coach at South Australian Sports Institute. In 2008, he was appointed National Head Track Sprint Cycling Coach at the Australian Institute of Sport in Adelaide. He coached Anna Meares to gold and bronze medals at the 2012 Summer Olympics and 2016 Summer Olympics respectively. In October 2016, West stepped down from his national coaching role whilst he battled motor neurone disease.

West was a track sprint coach for Australia at the 1998, 2010 and 2014 Commonwealth Games. In 2016, he was awarded AIS Best of the Best at the Australian Institute of Sport Performance Awards.

West died on 20 August 2017 in Adelaide from motor neurone disease, age 57.

References

External links
 

1960 births
2017 deaths
Australian male cyclists
Olympic cyclists of Australia
Cyclists at the 1984 Summer Olympics
Commonwealth Games medallists in cycling
Commonwealth Games gold medallists for Australia
Neurological disease deaths in South Australia
Deaths from motor neuron disease
Australian Institute of Sport coaches
Australian Olympic coaches
Cyclists at the 1982 Commonwealth Games
Medallists at the 1982 Commonwealth Games